Jin Bo (born 20 January 1993 in Helong, Yanbian) is a Chinese footballer of Korean descent who currently plays for Guangzhou R&F in the Chinese Super League.

Club career
Jin Bo went to Portugal following Chinese Football Association 500.com Stars Project and joined Casa Pia youth team system in December 2011. He joined Segunda Divisão side Fátima in the summer of 2012. Jin returned to China in 2013 and was promoted to China League One side Yanbian FC's first team squad. He made his senior debut on 20 April 2013 in a 0–0 draw against Shenyang Shenbei. On 30 May 2015, he scored his first senior goal in a 2–0 home win over Dalian Aerbin. Jin scored two goals in 24 league appearances in the 2015 season, as Yanbian won the title of the league and promoted to the Chinese Super League. On 8 April 2016, he made his Super League debut in a 0–0 draw against Guangzhou R&F, coming on as a substitute for Sun Jun in the 77th minute.

On 5 February 2019, Jin transferred to Chinese Super League side Guangzhou R&F. He would make his debut on 1 May 2019 in a Chinese FA Cup game to third tier club Taizhou Yuanda F.C. that ended in a 1-0 defeat.

Career statistics

Statistics accurate as of match played 31 December 2020.

Honours

Club
Yanbian FC
 China League One: 2015

References

External links
 

1993 births
Living people
Chinese footballers
People from Yanbian
C.D. Fátima players
Yanbian Funde F.C. players
Guangzhou City F.C. players
Chinese Super League players
China League One players
Chinese people of Korean descent
Chinese expatriate footballers
Expatriate footballers in Portugal
Chinese expatriate sportspeople in Portugal
Association football forwards